The snub-nosed spiny eel, Notacanthus chemnitzii, is a member of the family Notacanthidae, the deep-sea spiny eels, which are not true eels (Anguilliformes). The snub-nosed spiny eel exists in waters all over the world, except in the tropics, ranging in color from light tan to bluish grey in small ones to dark brown in large ones.  Its primary food is sea anemones.  The eel usually lives in deep waters, mostly more than 200 m below the surface.

References

Notacanthidae
Fish described in 1788